In histopathology, nuclear moulding, also nuclear molding, is conformity of adjacent cell nuclei to one another. 

It is a feature of small cell carcinomas and particularly useful for differentiation of small cell and non-small cell carcinomas, i.e. adenocarcinoma and squamous carcinoma.

See also
Merkel cell carcinoma
Lung cancer

References

Pathology